The 2016–17 Western Sydney Wanderers W-League season was the club's fifth season in the W-League, the premier competition for women's football in Australia. The team played home games at Marconi Stadium and Popondetta Park in Sydney.

Players

Transfers in

Transfers out

Contract extensions

Managerial staff

Statistics

Squad statistics

Competitions

W-League

League table

Results summary

Results by round

Fixtures

References

External links
 

Western Sydney Wanderers FC (A-League Women) seasons
2016–17 W-League (Australia) by team